Damuqiao Road is an interchange station between Line 4 and Line 12 of the Shanghai Metro. This station was one of 16 that opened in the third section from ( to ) of Line 12 on 19 December 2015. Between 31 December 2005 and 29 December 2007, this station served as the western terminus of Line 4 before the remaining section of the loop between here and Lancun Road opened on 29 December 2007.

Station layout

References

Shanghai Metro stations in Xuhui District
Line 4, Shanghai Metro
Line 12, Shanghai Metro
Railway stations in China opened in 2005
Railway stations in Shanghai
Xuhui District